Jukka Tapio Rautakorpi (born December 17, 1963 in Kauhajoki, Finland) is a Finnish ice hockey coach.

Career

Shortly after his playing career ended, Rautakorpi began his coaching career starting out with the under-16 team of JYP Jyväskylä.  After two years with the under-16 squad, he progressed to the under-18 team then the under-20 squad. In 1994–95 Rautakorpi moved up to become an assistant coach with JYP Jyväskylä on the SM-liiga squad.

Rautakorpi moved on to Tappara for the 1995-96 season for his first stint as a head coach in the SM-liiga. He stayed for 2 seasons coaching 100 regular season games for a record of 42 wins, 43 losses and 15 ties, both seasons Tappara lost in the playoff quarterfinals.

From 1997-1999, Rautakorpi coached various Finnish junior teams including the under-18 team at the 1998 IIHF European U18 Championship winning silver, and the under-20 team in the 1999 IIHF World U20 Championship finishing 5th.

Tappara rehired Rautakorpi for the 1999–2000 season and he started his second run as Tappara head coach that would last 4 seasons this time. Rautakorpi had a much more successful tenure this time amassing a record of 126 wins, 69 losses and 27 ties in 222 games.  Under his tutelage, Tappara appeared in the 2000–01 and 2001–02 finals and won the Kanada-malja as playoff champion in 2002–03.

Rautakorpi spent 2 seasons as the head coach of Finnish club Lukko leading the club to a record of 52 wins, 36 losses, 14 ties, 4 overtime wins (OTW) and 6 overtime losses (OTL).  However, in his first season with the club, they lost in the playoff quarterfinals, and in the second, they lost out to HPK for third place in the playoffs.

Rautakorpi was back with Tappara again for the 2005–06 season, coaching the team to record of 28 wins, 15 losses, 5 OTW and 8 OTL, finishing 4th in the regular season but losing in the quarterfinals of the playoffs.

Rautakorpi did not coach the 2006–07 season, but signed for 2007–08 with Leksands IF of the Swedish HockeyAllsvenskan which marks the only time he has coached outside of Finland. Rautakorpi led Leksands to a 1st-place finish in the regular season which allowed them to play in the Kvalserien. The series could have led to a promotion to the Elitserien but they were unsuccessful, finishing 5th in the tournament, going back to HockeyAllsvenskan for the next season.

Finnish club HPK signed Rautakorpi to be their head coach for the 2008–09 season after a disappointing 2007–08 season, in which they did not make the playoffs. Rautakorpi was able to lead HPK to the playoffs again in 2008-09 finishing 3rd in the regular season but losing in the quarterfinal round of the playoffs. Rautakorpi remained with HPK for the 2009–10 season as well, leading HPK to a 5th-place finish in the regular season and all the way to the finals in the playoffs where they were defeated by TPS.

Rautakorpi was back with the Finnish under-18 team for the 2010–11 season. He coached them in the 2011 IIHF World U18 Championships finishing 5th.

After not coaching the 2011–12 season, Rautakorpi was back with Tappara again for the 2012–13 season. In his first season back with Tappara, he led the team to a 2nd-place finish in the regular season and all the way to the finals in the playoffs, but were defeated by Ässät for the championship.

Career coaching statistics

Regular season and playoffs

International

References

External links

Profile at Tappara official website (in Finnish)

1963 births
Living people
People from Kauhajoki
Finnish ice hockey players
Finnish ice hockey coaches
Sportspeople from South Ostrobothnia